Jagodina Airport is situated in the close vicinity of Jagodina, Serbia about , northwest of town centre.

It is used for sports and training flights of aircraft and glider and also for parachuting jumps.

With decision of the Directorate of Civil Aviation, from 8 March 2012, Jagodina was officially given sport airport, the second of its kind in the Pomoravlje District next to Paraćin-Davidovac Airport.

Jagodina, after 60 years, officially got the Barutana airfield at the Štiplje road, and now parachutists and pilots from the Aero Club Jagodina will finally have its own airport.

Since the establish of the club in 1938, never more than in 2011 year is not invested. Than was purchase stainless steel tank for avio gasoline, which is the first property of the Aero Club.

In airfield reconstruction last year, Jagodina invested about 3 million dinars from the city budget and donors.

History
The Jagodina Aero Club was formed in the year 1936 and started to work in 1938.

Though Jagodina has a seven-decade-long tradition of aviation, the local military and civilian airport was shut down in 1952, and the runway was converted into agricultural land.

Today, the club has 146 members, as modelers, parachutists and five licensed pilots. The club has two aircraft and two kites.

Future plans
In future is planned to build a sports and business airport with occasional charter flights of the 80-seat planes.

References 

Airports in Serbia